Biafada (ga-njoola) is a Senegambian language of Guinea-Bissau.

Biafada is heavily influenced by Mandinka. Variants on the name include Beafada, Bedfola, Biafar, Bidyola, Dfola, Fada.

References

Fula–Tenda languages
Languages of Guinea-Bissau